CFTR (680 AM; CityNews 680, formerly 680 News) is a commercial all-news radio station licensed to Toronto, Ontario, serving the Greater Toronto Area. Owned by the Rogers Sports & Media subsidiary of Rogers Communications, the station became Canada's first solo station to broadcast an all-news radio format, following in the footsteps of the CKO national all-news radio network, a format that has since been replicated in major markets across the country. The CFTR studios are located at the Rogers Building at Bloor and Jarvis Streets in downtown Toronto, while the station transmitter is located on the southern edge of Lake Ontario at Oakes and Winston Road (near the QEW and Casablanca Road) in nearby Grimsby.

While CFTR broadcasts at the maximum power for Canadian AM stations, 50,000 watts, it must use a complicated directional antenna system to avoid interfering with other stations on 680 AM. In addition to a standard analog transmission, CFTR is simulcast on the second HD digital subchannel of CKIS-FM, and is available online. CityNews 680 is also simulcast on Bell Satellite TV channel 958.

History

Early years 
The station launched on August 8, 1962. Its original frequency was 1540 kHz, using the call letters CHFI, simulcasting the beautiful music of sister station CHFI-FM, one of Canada's first FM radio stations. Because 1540 is a clear-channel frequency assigned to stations in the United States and the Bahamas, CHFI was authorized to broadcast only during the daytime. In 1963, it sought to pay CHLO in St. Thomas, Ontario to move from 680 to another frequency, to free up 680 for CHFI's use. No deal was finalized, but, by 1966, the stations reached an agreement to share 680, and CHFI moved to 24-hour operation at that frequency.

In 1971, so as to distinguish itself from CHFI-FM, the station changed its call letters to CFTR; the "TR" being a tribute to Ted Rogers, Sr., radio pioneer and father of controlling shareholder Ted Rogers.

In 1972, CFTR abandoned the beautiful music simulcast of CHFI and adopted a Top 40 format. For many years, it was the primary competition to Toronto's original Top 40 station, CHUM.

In 1973, programmer Chuck Camroux upped the ante in the Toronto radio "Rock and Roll Wars" by tweaking CFTR's notoriously bad signal, adding some reverb, and hiring new morning man Jim Brady to rival CHUM's Jay Nelson. Both stations hovered near one million listeners per week. Although Brady finally topped Nelson in the ratings in 1979, over-all, CFTR didn't surpass CHUM in the Toronto BBM ratings until 1984. Once CFTR gained ratings supremacy, CHUM dropped Top 40 in favour of an adult contemporary music format in 1986.

CFTR also hired John Records Landecker from WLS in Chicago in 1981. Landecker spent two years at the station before returning to Chicago to work at WLUP.

All-news era

Through the 1980s and 1990s, music listeners switched to FM, prompting AM stations like CFTR to find non-music formats. On June 1, 1993, at 10 a.m., CFTR announced it would be discontinuing the Top 40 format, and began broadcasting a countdown of "the top 500 songs of the (then) past 25 years" titled "The CFTR Story." At 6 a.m. on June 7, after playing Phil Collins' "Against All Odds" (which was the #1 song in the countdown) and Starship's "We Built This City" (which also ended CHUM's Top 40 era in 1986), CFTR adopted its present all-news format. It was the first all-news radio station in Canada since the end of the former CKO network in 1989.

The station offers listeners a "weather guarantee" jackpot, which is drawn from a pool of listeners who enter the contest.

In June 2021, Rogers announced that it would rebrand CFTR and its other all-news and news/talk radio stations under the CityNews brand. The rebranding took effect on October 18, 2021.

Notable staff
Bob McAdorey (1970-1976), formerly CHUM, later Global News entertainment editor and co-anchor
Arlene Bynon - news (1980-1984) hosted Sunday, Sunday newsmagazine, moved to CHFI-FM and later hosted talk shows on the Global Television Network, AM 640, and Sirius XM Canada's Canada Talks channel
John Records Landecker - morning man (1981-1983)
Jesse and Gene - (Jesse Dylan and Gene Valaitis) (1989-1993), first in afternoon drive, moved to morning drive in 1991
 Chris Mavridis - reporter (1997-2000)
 Rick Moranis (using the stage name Rick Allen) - (ca. 1973)

References

External links
 
 
 CFTR: The Legend 1978-1982 tribute page
 
 Radio-Locator information on CFTR

FTR
FTR
FTR
Radio stations established in 1962
1962 establishments in Ontario